Christian Le Guillochet (20 September 1933 in Albi – 10 February 2011 in Paris) was a French actor, playwright and theatre director.

With his wife , he created the cultural center  in Paris.

Biography 
Born in Albi in 1933 from a railway father and a nursing mother, he was a worker when he was summoned to fight in Algeria. Back in France, he attended evening classes and obtained a degree in technical and commercial engineering. He took drama classes to cure his shyness. In 1963, Robert Dhéry noticed and engaged him in Grosse Valse. He learned much by observing the star of the show, Louis de Funès.

In 1964, he founded a first café-théâtre, then "Le Lucernaire" in 1968, near the Montparnasse métro station, rue d'Odessa. Ten years later, expelled because of the construction of the Montparnasse Tower, he installed "Le Lucernaire" at 53 rue Notre-Dame des Champs.

In the 1970s, he began a long-term friendship with Laurent Terzieff to whom he entrusted the artistic direction of the Lucernaire for five years.

In 2004, his wife died, and, at age 70, he sold the "Lucernaire" to the group owner of the publishing house L'Harmattan.

Filmography 
 1964: Heaven on One's Head, by Yves Ciampi
 1966: Le Solitaire passe à l'attaque, by Ralph Habib
 1968: Le Débutant, by Daniel Daert
 1969: Ciné-Girl, by Francis Leroi - Michaël 
 1971: The Lion's Share, by Jean Larriaga
 1976: Monsieur Sade, by Jacques Robin

Television 
 1966: Illusions perdues, by Maurice Cazeneuve - Horace Bienchon
 1967: The Flashing Blade, by Yannick Andréi - episodes 6 to 9 and 12 - Robiro 
 1968: Le Tribunal de l'Impossible : Nostradamus prophète en son pays, by Pierre Badel
 1969: Que ferait donc Faber ? byt Dolorès Grassian
 1970: Quentin Durward, by Gilles Grangier - Le Glorieux 
 1972: Vassa Geleznova, by Pierre Badel - Piaterkine 
 1980: Façades, by Jacques Robin - Angelo Sordi 
 1981: Mon meilleur Noël - episode : L'Oiseau bleu, by Gabriel Axel - Le Peuplier

Books 
1995: L'oiseau éventail, Prix Emmanuel Roblès 1996
2006: 50 ans de Théâtre, depuis l'impasse Odessa jusqu'à la rue Notre-Dame des Champs, Éditions L'Harmattan
2008: Le Chien citoyen, L'Harmattan

References

External links 
 
 Vidéo : « Démolition du Lucernaire »: 10 July 1976,  interroge Christian Le Guillochet sur la démolition du Lucernaire. Les comédiens détruisent le théâtre à coup de masse.
 Adieu à Christian Le Guillochet on Le Figaro théâtre (17 February 2011)
 Christian Le Guillochet, fondateur du Lucernaire on Le Monde (2 March 2011)
 Christian Le Guillochet, le fondateur du Théâtre du Lucernaire est décédé on Scène web
 Christian Le Guillochet on the site of Éditions L'Harmattan

20th-century French dramatists and playwrights
20th-century French male actors
French theatre directors
Prix Emmanuel Roblès recipients
People from Albi
1933 births
2011 deaths